Vanchykivtsi is a village in Chernivtsi Raion, Chernivtsi Oblast, Ukraine. It hosts the administration of Vanchykivtsi rural hromada, one of the hromadas of Ukraine. 

Until 18 July 2020, Vanchykivtsi belonged to Novoselytsia Raion. The raion was abolished in July 2020 as part of the administrative reform of Ukraine, which reduced the number of raions of Chernivtsi Oblast to three. The area of Novoselytsia Raion was split between Chernivtsi and Dnistrovskyi Raions, with Vanchykivtsi being transferred to Chernivtsi Raion. Vanchykivtsi is home to the recently remodeled historical Orthodox church Saint Vasily's. The southern edge of the village ends in barbed wire marking the border with Romania and with European Union. Vanchykivtsi is known for using shovels instead of hoes to plant potatoes.

References

Villages in Chernivtsi Raion
Khotinsky Uyezd
Populated places on the Prut